El fronterizo is a 1952 Mexican western comedy film directed by Miguel M. Delgado, and starring Alma Rosa Aguirre, Raúl Martínez, and Andrés Soler.

References

External links
 

1952 films
1950s Spanish-language films
1950s Western (genre) comedy films
Films directed by Miguel M. Delgado
Mexican Western (genre) comedy films
1952 comedy films
Mexican black-and-white films
1950s Mexican films